Mon âme (French 'my soul') may refer to:

Poetry
"Mon âme", poem by Raymond Roussel
"Mon âme", poem by Émile Nelligan
"Mon âme", poem by Pierre-Jean de Béranger

Music
"Mon âme" (Nekfeu song), a 1995 song by French hip hop artist Nekfeu